Lateesha Ector (born 1985) is a fashion model and Canadian beauty queen. She was crowned as Miss Earth Canada 2009 in the annual Miss Earth Canada beauty pageant in August 2009. She is the first Black woman crowned Miss Earth Canada. She represented Canada in Miss Earth 2009.

Background
Ector was born in Montreal, Quebec. Ector's parents are from Trinidad and Tobago and have heritage from Black, Chinese, Scottish, and Venezuelan backgrounds. As a young girl she was involved in classical ballet, and earned a Bachelor's degree in psychology from Concordia University. She currently lives in Montreal, Quebec.

Miss Universe Canada 2008
She placed in the top 20 semifinalist, which was participated by 62 contestants from across Canada.

Miss Earth 2009
On August 22, 2009, Ector was crowned as Miss Earth Canada at Les Cours Mont-Royal in Quebec. She represented Canada in the ninth edition of Miss Earth beauty pageant in the Philippines on November 22, 2009. She placed in top 15 for talent competition and top 15 in swimwear competition. The Miss Earth winner serves as the spokesperson for the Miss Earth Foundation, the United Nations Environment Programme (UNEP) and other environmental organizations.

See also
Miss Earth
Miss Earth 2009

References

External links
Miss Earth Canada official website
Miss Earth official website
Woman of the Earth

1985 births
Living people
Canadian people of Chinese descent
Canadian people of Scottish descent
Canadian people of Trinidad and Tobago descent
Canadian people of Venezuelan descent
Miss Earth 2009 contestants
Models from Montreal
Canadian beauty pageant winners
Concordia University alumni